Adjunct may refer to:

 Adjunct (grammar), words used as modifiers
 Adjunct professor, a rank of university professor
 Adjuncts, sources of sugar used in brewing
 Adjunct therapy used to complement another main therapeutic agent, either to improve efficacy or to reduce side-effects
 The adjugate of a matrix, sometimes called the adjunct

See also 
 Adjunction, a possible relationship between two functors in mathematics, specifically category theory
 Adjuvant
 Adjutant is a military rank or appointment, an officer who assists a more senior officer.